Manuel Zeferino (born 23 July 1960) is a Portuguese former racing cyclist, who competed as a professional from 1984 to 1992. He most notably won the Volta a Portugal in 1981. He rode in the 1984 Tour de France.

Major results

1980
 10th Overall Volta a Portugal
1981
 1st  Overall Volta a Portugal
1st Stages 1, 2a (TTT) & 7 (ITT)
1982
 1st  Overall Grande Prémio Jornal de Notícias
1st Stage 6b
 3rd Overall Volta a Portugal
1984
 1st Stage 2b (ITT) Volta ao Algarve
 2nd Overall Volta a Portugal
1st Stage 12b (ITT)
1985
 1st Stage 5 Grande Prémio Jornal de Notícias
 4th Overall Volta a Portugal
1st Stage 13b
1986
 1st  Overall Volta ao Alentejo
1st Stages 1 (TTT) & 3b (ITT)
 1st  Overall GP Costa Azul
1st Stage 3
 7th Overall Volta a Portugal
1989
 1st Overall Grande Prémio Correio da Manhã
1st Stage 1
 3rd Overall Volta ao Algarve
 4th Overall Volta a Portugal
1990
 8th Overall Volta a Portugal
1992
 2nd Overall GP Costa Azul

References

External links

1960 births
Living people
Portuguese male cyclists
People from Póvoa de Varzim
Volta a Portugal winners
Sportspeople from Porto District